Horseshoe Bay (Sḵwx̱wú7mesh: Ch'ax̱áy̓) is a community of about 1,000 permanent residents, located in West Vancouver, in the Canadian province of British Columbia.  Situated on the western tip of West Vancouver at the entrance to Howe Sound, the village marks the western end of Highway 1 on mainland British Columbia (and furthermore the main route of the Trans-Canada Highway on the Canadian mainland). It also serves as the southern end of the Sea-to-Sky Highway, with Lions Bay just 15 minutes north.

Horseshoe Bay is the location of the third-busiest BC Ferries terminal, the Horseshoe Bay ferry terminal. Because of the presence of the ferry terminal, it is considered a control city on the Upper Levels Highway westbound.

Gallery

External links

2006 Aerial view of Horseshoe Bay from Randall & Kat's Flying Photos

Populated places on the British Columbia Coast
Neighbourhoods in West Vancouver